Milan Varga (born August 1, 1983) is a Slovak former ice hockey defenceman.

Career 
Varga played in the Tipsport Liga for HC Košice, HK Poprad, MHk 32 Liptovský Mikuláš and MsHK Žilina, playing a total of 301 games in nine seasons. He also played in the MOL Liga for Dunaújvárosi Acélbikák and CSM Corona Brașov as well as spending four seasons with Aigles de Nice in France. He played three seasons in the FFHG Division 1 and one in Ligue Magnus before leaving the team on January 28, 2017.

Varga played in the 2003 IIHF World U20 Championship for Slovakia, playing six games and scoring one goal.

References

External links

1983 births
Living people
Les Aigles de Nice players
HSC Csíkszereda players
Dunaújvárosi Acélbikák players
HC Havířov players
HC Košice players
MHk 32 Liptovský Mikuláš players
HK Poprad players
HC Prešov players
Slovak ice hockey defencemen
Sportspeople from Košice
MsHK Žilina players
Slovak expatriate ice hockey people
Slovak expatriate sportspeople in Romania
Expatriate ice hockey players in Romania
Slovak expatriate sportspeople in Hungary
Expatriate ice hockey players in Hungary
Slovak expatriate sportspeople in France
Expatriate ice hockey players in France